Time to Go may refer to:

Time to Go: The Southern Psychedelic Moment 1981-1986, a 2012 compilation album
"A Time to Go", a song by Bobby Hutcherson from the 1980 album Patterns
"Time to Go", a song by Dean Lewis from the 2019 album A Place We Knew
"Time to Go", a song composed by Delia Derbyshire, released on the 2002 remaster of 1968's BBC Radiophonic Music
"Time to Go", a song by Dropkick Murphys from the 2003 album Blackout
"Time to Go", a song by Dumb Luck from The Naked Truth EP (2000)
"Time to Go", a song by Keane, released as a B-side to the 2008 single "The Lovers Are Losing"
"Time to Go", a song by Nina Sky, 2004
"Time to Go", a song by Oprichniki from the 2001 split EP Toxic Holocaust / Oprichniki
"Time to Go", a song by Saga from the 1980 album Silent Knight
"Time to Go", a song by Supergrass from the 1995 album I Should Coco
"Time to Go", a song by The Maine from the 2008 album Can't Stop Won't Stop
"Time to Go", a song by Wilfred Sanderson
"Party II (Time to Go)", a song by MxPx from The Renaissance EP (2001)
"Second Class Male"/"Time to Go", a pair of satirical columns in The Observer in 1999

See also
Goodnight, It's Time to Go, a 1961 album by Jack McDuff
Time to Go Home, a 2015 album by Chastity Belt